Home and Away is an Australian soap opera that has aired since 17 January 1988. The series and its cast and crew have been nominated for a variety of different awards, including Logie Awards, AWGIE Awards and The British Soap Awards.

All About Soap Awards
The All About Soap Awards are held yearly by All About Soap magazine.

Australian Academy of Cinema and Television Arts Awards
The Australian Academy of Cinema and Television Arts Awards (AACTA Awards) recognise excellence in the film and television industries, both locally and internationally. They were originally called the Australian Film Institute Awards (AFI Awards).

Australian Directors Guild Awards

Australian Writers Guild Awards
The AWGIE Awards are an annual awards ceremony hosted by the Australian Writers Guild for excellence in television, stage and radio writing.

The British Soap Awards
The British Soap Awards began in 1999. They celebrate excellence in soap operas.

Digital Spy Reader Awards
The Digital Spy Soap Awards are hosted by the British entertainment and media website Digital Spy. The first awards were presented in 2008, where Home and Away was nominated in 12 of the 14 categories.

Equity Ensemble Awards
The Equity Ensemble Awards are presented by The Equity Foundation, the performers branch of the Media, Entertainment and Arts Alliance (MEAA). Accolades are handed out to the best cast in a television comedy series, drama series and miniseries or TV film.

Inside Soap Awards
The Inside Soap Awards are voted for by readers of Inside Soap magazine. The awards have been running since 1996.

Logie Awards
Home and Away is the most successful recipient of Logie Awards, having won forty-seven Logies to date.

National Television Awards
The National Television Awards are a British television awards ceremony. The NTAs results are voted for by the general public and the award categories are given the title of Most Popular.

Nickelodeon Australian Kids' Choice Award
The Nickelodeon Australian Kids' Choice Awards
is an annual awards show usually held during October or November. It is televised and the winners are chosen and voted for by children.

TV Tonight Awards

TV Week and Soap Extra #OMGAwards

Notes

 Certain award groups do not simply award one winner. They recognize several different recipients and have runners-up. Since this is a specific recognition and is different from losing an award, runner-up mentions are considered wins in this award tally.

References

Lists of awards by television series
Home and Away